Heritage College may refer to:
Heritage College (Gatineau) in Gatineau, Quebec
Heritage College (Calgary) in Calgary, Alberta
Heritage College, a trade school in Las Vegas, Nevada; now a campus of Brightwood College
Heritage Colleges (Australia) a group of Christadelphian schools in Australia
Heritage College, Perth, Christadelphian school in Perth, Western Australia
Heritage University, formerly Heritage College, in Toppenish, Washington
Heritage College & Seminary in Cambridge, Ontario

See also
 Heritage (disambiguation)
 Heritage School (disambiguation)
 Heritage High School (disambiguation)
 American Heritage School (disambiguation)
 Christian Heritage School (disambiguation)
 Heritage Academy (disambiguation)